Mont Beauvoir is a Chartreuse mountain culminating at  above sea level in the township of Saint-Jean-de-Couz in the French department of Savoie.  Mont Beauvoir is part of the Jura Mountain range.

Geography 
Mount Beauvoir forms a ridge southwest / northeast and is mainly composed of forest (conifers).

Access 
It can be reached by the departmental road 1006 from Saint-Jean-de-Couz or after the tunnel of Les Échelles.

References 

Mountains of the Alps
Mountains of Savoie
Chartreuse Mountains